The 70th Primetime Emmy Awards honored the best in US prime time television programming from June 1, 2017, until May 31, 2018, as chosen by the Academy of Television Arts & Sciences. The ceremony was held live on September 17, 2018, at the Microsoft Theater in Downtown Los Angeles, California, and was broadcast in the U.S. by NBC. The ceremony was hosted by Michael Che and Colin Jost.

The nominations were announced by Ryan Eggold and Samira Wiley on July 12, 2018. The biggest winner of the night was Amazon Prime Video's comedy-drama The Marvelous Mrs. Maisel, which won five trophies, including the honor for Outstanding Comedy Series, making history by becoming the first streaming television series to claim the prize. Game of Thrones also won its third trophy for Outstanding Drama Series, and Peter Dinklage tied for the most wins for Outstanding Supporting Actor in a Drama Series, with his third victory for Game of Thrones. He would get the sole record by winning for the eighth and final season the very next year.

With a U.S. viewership of 10.2 million that reflects an 11% drop from the previous year, it was the then-least watched show in Emmy history. It was also the first time in the show's history that Modern Family was not nominated for Outstanding Comedy Series after eight successive nominations and a record five wins from 2010 to 2014. 

The three wins of John Legend, Andrew Lloyd Webber, and Tim Rice made them the thirteenth, fourteenth, and fifteenth persons to become an EGOT.

Winners and nominees

Winners are listed first, highlighted in boldface, and indicated with a double dagger (‡). For simplicity, producers who received nominations for program awards have been omitted.

Programs

Acting

Lead performances

Supporting performances

Directing

Writing

Presenters and performers
The awards were presented by the following:

Presenters

Performers

Most major nominations
Programs that received multiple major nominations are listed below, by number of nominations per work and per network:

Most major wins

In Memoriam

 Anthony Bourdain
 Harry Anderson
 Bernie Casey
 Della Reese
 Jerry Van Dyke
 Craig Zadan
 Reg E. Cathey
 Steven Bochco
 Dick Enberg
 Lee Miller
 Suzanne Patmore Gibbs
 Bruce Margolis
 Jim Nabors
 Bill Daily
 Bob Schiller
 Paul Junger Witt
 David Ogden Stiers
 John Mahoney
 Thad Mumford
 Hugh Wilson
 Charlotte Rae
 Henri Bollinger
 David Cassidy
 Robert Guillaume
 Hugh Hefner
 Marian Rees
 Jimmy Nickerson
 Mitzi Shore
 Neil Simon
 Monty Hall
 Burt Reynolds
 Rose Marie
 John McCain
 Aretha Franklin

Notes

References

External links
 
 Emmys.com list of 2018 Nominees & Winners
 Academy of Television Arts and Sciences website

070
2018 in American television
2018 in Los Angeles
2018 awards in the United States
2018 television awards
September 2018 events in the United States
Television shows directed by Hamish Hamilton (director)